CompuHigh is a private, accredited, online high school established in 1994. CompuHigh provides individual courses as well as a diploma program called Whitmore School. CompuHigh is accredited by AdvancED (formerly known as NCA CASI and SACS CASI). CompuHigh serves national U.S. and international English-speaking students in grades 9–12. CompuHigh has open, year-round enrollment and is self-paced.

CompuHigh offers core and elective courses that are taught by instructors using a mastery learning methodology.  Instruction is completely one-on-one between instructor and student, and is largely asynchronous. Instruction, interaction, coursework, and grading takes place on CompuHigh's proprietary learning management system (LMS)

References

Online schools in the United States
For-profit high schools in the United States